Dennis Danvers (born 1947) is an American author of science fiction novels.  He lives in Richmond, Virginia. He is the president of the Byrd Park Civic League.

Bibliography 

Time and Time Again (1994), 
Circuit of Heaven (1998), 
End of Days (1999), 
The Fourth World (2000), 
The Watch (2002), described as "being the unauthorized sequel to Peter A. Kropotkin's Memoirs of a Revolutionist as imparted to Dennis Danvers by Anchee Mahur, traveler from a distant future"
The Bright Spot (2005), written under the pen name Robert Sydney.
Bad Angels (2015)
Adult Children of Alien Beings. A Tor.Com Original (2015) 
Orphan Pirates of the Spanish Main. A Tor.Com Original (2016) 
Once More Into The Abyss. A Tor.Com Original (2016)

Critical studies and reviews of Danvers' work

References

External links

 Dennis Danvers official web site
 Dennis Danvers novelettes at Tor.com
 Dennis Danvers bio at Encyclopedia of Science Fiction
 Stan's trilogy at Book Reviews & Reading Guides

1947 births
Living people
20th-century American novelists
21st-century American novelists
American male novelists
American science fiction writers
Writers from Richmond, Virginia
20th-century American male writers
21st-century American male writers
Novelists from Virginia